Oreshnik (Karais or Καρυές Karyes) is a village in the municipality of Topolovgrad, in Haskovo Province, in southern Bulgaria.

References

External links

 Website of the village

Villages in Haskovo Province